Charles Alfred Richard Coleman was a first-class cricketer and test match umpire . Born in Gumley, Leicestershire in 1906, he played 114 first-class matches for Leicestershire between 1926 and 1935 as a right arm fast medium bowler and middle order batsman. He took 100 wickets and scored 2403 runs with a best of 114. He stood in 2 England v South Africa tests in 1947 and died in Market Harborough in 1978.

1906 births
English cricketers
Leicestershire cricketers
English Test cricket umpires
1978 deaths
People from Market Harborough
Cricketers from Leicestershire
English cricket umpires